Cologne School may refer to:
Cologne School of Painting, a medieval group of painters
Cologne School (music), a late-20th-century group of composers and performers

Disambiguation pages